Campylocheta inepta is a species of fly in the family Tachinidae. It is found in the Palearctic. This species is a parasite of mainly Geometridae larvae but also several other families of Lepidoptera associated with heathland and moorland. Campylocheta inepta occurs in montane areas with pine forests in most of Europe but the species is also found in lower areas in central Europe and Spain.

References

Dexiinae
Insects described in 1824
Diptera of Europe
Taxa named by Johann Wilhelm Meigen